Kvanhovden Lighthouse is a coastal lighthouse located in the municipality of Kinn in Vestland county, Norway. The lighthouse sits on the northwestern shore of the island of Hovden, at the southern entrance to the Frøysjøen strait.

History
It was first built in 1895 and it was automated in 1980.

The occulting light emits a white, red, or green light (depending on direction) once every six seconds. The site is accessible by boat, but there are no road connections to the lighthouse from the rest of the island.

See also

Lighthouses in Norway
List of lighthouses in Norway

References

External links
 Norsk Fyrhistorisk Forening 
 Picture of Kvanhovden Lighthouse

Lighthouses completed in 1895
Lighthouses in Vestland
Kinn